Vicente Tirona Paterno (November 18, 1925 – November 21, 2014) was a Filipino businessman and politician. He served as Minister of Industry (1974–1979) and of Public Highways (1979–1980) during the Ferdinand Marcos' government. He also served as a member of the Interim Batasang Pambansa from 1978 to 1984 and later as Senator from 1987 to 1992.

Early life
Vicente Tirona Paterno was born in Quiapo, Manila on November 18, 1925, to Jose P. Paterno and Jacoba Encarnacion Tirona.

Educational life
He is a graduate of De La Salle high school class 41 and later on earned his Bachelor of Science in Mechanical Engineering degree at the University of the Philippines in 1948 and obtained Master of Business Administration at Harvard University in 1953.

Paterno was a lecturer in graduate school of U.P., La Salle and Ateneo de Manila from 1954 to 1962.

Personal life
He is survived by his wife Baby, his children Judy, Mailin, Maite, Victor and Tina, and his eight grandchildren.

Career
In October 1982, he founded Philippine Seven Corp. He is known for becoming the first general manager of Phinma and the first Filipino treasurer of Manila Electric Company (Meralco).

Paterno started Philippine Seven Corporation in 1982. Popularly known as 7-Eleven, the convenience store has over 1,200 branches in the country.

He served as independent director for different companies such as City Resources Phil Corp., Benpres Holdings Corp., Metro Pacific Tollways Corp., Cityland Development Corp. and of First Philippine Holdings. He eventually resigned as his health failed.

Paterno won several awards – the Order of the Sacred Treasure from the Emperor of Japan, the 1982 MAP Management Man of the Year, and the 2013 Ramon V. del Rosario Award.

Political life
He was elected as a representative to the Batasang Pambansa following his resignation from President Ferdinand Marcos's Kilusang Bagong Lipunan. He criticized the administration's assassination of opposition Sen. Benigno Aquino Jr. With Marcos, Paterno said technocrats had free reins to handle the economy except in cement prices, as he felt Marcos knew little in economics but had an edifice complex.

He became chairman of the National Citizens' Movement for Free Elections (Namfrel) during the 1986 presidential elections.

Afterwards, Paterno was appointed Deputy Executive Secretary for Energy from April 1986 to February 1987, and Chairman of the Philippine National Oil Company from March 1986 to February 1987.

President Corazon Aquino convinced him to run for senator. He served one term from 1987 to 1992.

Death and legacy
Former Senator Vicente Paterno died at 8:40 in the morning of November 21, 2014. He was 89 years old.

References

External links
The obituary of Vicente Paterno - ABS-CBN News

1925 births
2014 deaths
People from Quiapo, Manila
21st-century Filipino businesspeople
Senators of the 8th Congress of the Philippines
Secretaries of Trade and Industry of the Philippines
Secretaries of Public Works and Highways of the Philippines
University of the Philippines alumni
Ferdinand Marcos administration cabinet members
Members of the Batasang Pambansa
Harvard Business School alumni
Recipients of the Presidential Medal of Merit (Philippines)
20th-century Filipino businesspeople